Homomorphic Encryption library or HElib is a free and open-source cross platform software developed by IBM that implements various forms of homomorphic encryption.

History 
HElib was primarily developed by Shai Halevi and Victor Shoup, shortly after Craig Gentry was a researcher at IBM, with the initial release being on May 5th 2013.

Features 
The library implements the Brakerski-Gentry-Vaikuntanathan (BGV) fully homomorphic encryption scheme, as well as optimizations such as Smart-Vercauteren ciphertext packing techniques. 

HElib is written in C++ and uses the NTL mathematical library.

References 

Homomorphic encryption
Cryptographic software
Free and open-source software
IBM software